Argentina at the 1952 Summer Olympics in Helsinki, Finland was the nation's ninth appearance out of twelve editions of the Summer Olympic Games. Argentina sent to the 1952 Summer Olympics its sixth national team, under the auspices of the Argentine Olympic Committee (Comité Olímpico Argentino), 123 athletes (115 men and the 8 woman), who competed in 77 events in 15 sports They brought home five medals: 1 gold, 2 silver and 2 bronze. The flag bearer was Delfo Cabrera, the gold medalist in the immediately previous Summer Olympic Games marathon.

Medalists

Athletics

Basketball

Men's Team Competition
Main Round (Group C)
 Defeated Philippines (85-59)
 Defeated Canada (82-81)
 Defeated Brazil (72-56) 
Final Round (Group A)
 Defeated Bulgaria (100-56)
 Defeated France (61-52)
 Lost to Uruguay (65-66) 
Semifinals
 Lost to United States (76-85)
Bronze Medal Match
 Lost to Uruguay (59-68) → Fourth place
Team Roster
Leopoldo Contarbio
Oscar Furlong
Juan Gazsó
Ricardo González
Rafael Lledó
Alberto López
Rubén Menini
Omar Monza
Rubén Pagliari
Raúl Pérez Varela
Ignacio Poletti
Juan Uder
Hugo del Vecchio
Roberto Viau

Boxing

Cycling

Track Competition
Men's 1.000m Time Trial
Clodomiro Cortoni
 Final — 1:13.2 (→ 4th place)

Men's 1.000m Sprint Scratch Race
Antonio Giménez — 7th place

Equestrian

Fencing

Men's foil
 Fulvio Galimi
 Félix Galimi
 José Rodríguez

Men's team foil
 Fulvio Galimi, José Rodríguez, Eduardo Sastre, Félix Galimi, Santiago Massini

Men's épée
 Vito Simonetti
 Santiago Massini
 Enrique Rettberg

Men's sabre
 Daniel Sande
 José D'Andrea
 Edgardo Pomini

Men's team sabre
 Félix Galimi, José D'Andrea, Edgardo Pomini, Daniel Sande, Fulvio Galimi

Women's foil
 Elsa Irigoyen

Gymnastics

Modern pentathlon

Three male pentathletes represented Argentina in 1952.

Individual
 Luis Ribera
 Carlos Velázquez
 Jorge Cáceres

Team
 Luis Ribera
 Carlos Velázquez
 Jorge Cáceres

Rowing

Argentina had nine male rowers participate in three out of seven rowing events in 1952.

 Men's double sculls
 Tranquilo Cappozzo
 Eduardo Guerrero

 Men's coxless pair
 Alberto Madero
 Óscar Almirón

 Men's coxed four
 Juan Ecker
 Roberto Suárez
 Alfredo Czerner
 Jorge Schneider
 Jorge Arripe (cox)

Sailing

Open

Shooting

Seven shooters represented Argentina in 1952.

25 m pistol
 Carlos Enrique Díaz Sáenz Valiente
 Oscar Cervo

50 m pistol
 Carlos Choque

300 m rifle, three positions
 Pablo Cagnasso
 David Schiaffino

Trap
 Juan de Giacomo
 Fulvio Rocchi

Swimming

Men's 100 metres Freestyle
Federico Zwanck
Marcelo Trabucco

Men's 400 metres Freestyle
Carlos Alberto Bonacich
Alfredo Yantorno
Federico Zwanck

Men's 4×200 metres Freestyle Relay
Federico Zwanck
Marcelo Trabucco
Pedro Galvão
Alfredo Yantorno

Men's 100 metres Backstroke
Pedro Galvão

Men's 200 metres Breaststroke
Orlando Cossani

Women's 100 metres Freestyle
Ana María Schultz

Women's 400 metres Freestyle
Ana María Schultz

Water polo

Weightlifting

Wrestling

References

1952 in Argentine sport
Nations at the 1952 Summer Olympics
1952